Captain of the Deep is an album by the American jazz drummer Denis Charles, which was recorded live in 1991 at the Zuid-Nederlands Jazz Festival and released in 1998 on the Eremite label.

Reception

In his review for AllMusic, Steve Loewy wrote, "With a sound often approximating the work of early Ornette Coleman, the two horns spurt attractively dissonant themes, after which the four players turn out repeatedly fascinating solos and interactive lines."

Track listing
"We Don't" (Traditional) - 14:04
"Mota" (Breedlove) - 13:37
"Round About" (Breedlove / Charles / DeJoode / Moondoc)  - 15:38
"Jamaj's" (de Joode) - 9:40
"Rob" (Breedlove) - 13:35
"Tobie Continyou" (de Joode) - 6:05

Personnel
Denis Charles - drums
Nathan Breedlove - trumpet
Wilber de Joode - double bass
Jemeel Moondoc - alto saxophone

References

1998 live albums
Denis Charles live albums
Eremite Records live albums